Jose Herrera may refer to:
 José Joaquín de Herrera (1792–1854), three-time President of Mexico
 José Herrera (1960s outfielder) (1942–2009), Venezuelan professional baseball player
 José Herrera (Uruguayan footballer) (born 1965)
 José Herrera (Bolivian footballer) (born 2003)
 José Herrera (1990s outfielder) (born 1972),  Dominican professional baseball player
 José Cruz Herrera (1890–1972), Spanish painter
 José Carlos Herrera (born 1986), Mexican Olympic sprinter
 José Posada Herrera (1814–1885), Spanish jurist and politician
 José Herrera (catcher) (born 1997), Venezuelan professional baseball player